Hemus Air (Bulgarian title: Хемус Ер) was an airline based in Sofia, Bulgaria. It operated scheduled domestic and international services from Sofia and Varna, as well as charter, cargo and air ambulance services. Its main base was Sofia Airport, with a hub at Varna Airport. After the acquisition of Bulgaria Air, all of Hemus Air's destinations are now under the plate of Bulgaria Air.

History 
Hemus Air, named after the ancient name for the Balkan mountains, is owned by Varna-based industrial/financial enterprise TIM. The airline was established and started operations in 1986, when it branched off from Balkan Bulgarian Airlines. It initially operated as a separate department providing ambulance services, flight calibration and aerial photography. In 1996 it became a separate legal entity from Balkan and was named Hemus Air. The company was privatized by Bulgarian corporate investors in 2002 and has faced stiff competition from foreign carriers, as well as the newly established successor of Balkan, Bulgaria Air.

Hemus Air's management pledged to unite the major Bulgarian airlines and was selected as the preferred bidder for the sale of Bulgaria Air by the Bulgarian government. In November 2006, Balkan Hemus Group sealed a deal to purchase Bulgaria Air with a 99.99% share of the airline for €6.6 million. The new airline will operate under the Bulgaria Air brand. Hemus promised to invest a further €86m over the next five years. Hemus and Bulgaria Air began to coordinate their schedules and operations in 2007. As of February 2009, all Hemus Air aircraft are operating for the parent company, Bulgaria Air.

Destinations 
All Hemus Air destinations are now operated under the commercial brand of Bulgaria Air.

Fleet 

The Hemus Air fleet includes the following aircraft (at July 2012):

Most of these aircraft are operating for Bulgaria Air until the two airlines merge, then they will all be transferred to Bulgaria Air's fleet.

Retired fleet
 Boeing 737-300
 Boeing 737-400
 Tupolev Tu-134
 Tupolev Tu-154
 Yakovlev Yak-40
 Let L-410 Turbolet

Accidents and incidents 
 Hemus Air Flight 7081 was hijacked en route from Beirut International Airport to Varna on 3 September 1996. The hijacker, a member of the Popular Front for the Liberation of Palestine, allowed the 150 passengers to leave the aircraft at Varna and he and the eight crew members continued to Oslo Airport, Gardermoen where he gave up. He initially claimed that he only wanted to seek asylum, but he later claimed he was under orders to crash the aircraft into Oslo.

References

External links 

Bulgaria Air

Defunct airlines of Bulgaria
Airlines established in 1991
Airlines disestablished in 2010
Bulgarian companies established in 1991
2010 disestablishments in Bulgaria